The discography of Ben Folds, an American singer-songwriter, consists of five studio albums (including two collaborative albums), two live albums, ten compilation albums, two video albums, eight extended plays, and eighteen singles. See also Ben Folds Five discography.

Albums

Studio albums

Collaborative albums

Live albums

Compilation albums

Video albums

Extended plays

Singles

As lead artist

Guest appearances

See also 

 Shut Up and Listen to Majosha
 Fear of Pop: Volume 1
 The Bens (EP)

References

External links
 Official website
 
 
 

Discography
Rock music discographies
Discographies of American artists
Pop music discographies